Bishop Foley Catholic High School is a Catholic high school affiliated with the Roman Catholic Archdiocese of Detroit.  Founded in 1965, it is named after the first American Bishop of Detroit, John Samuel Foley.  It is located in Madison Heights, Michigan.

History
Bishop Foley Catholic High School opened in 1965 and was founded by Guardian Angels Church in Clawson and St. Dennis Church in Royal Oak. The first class graduated in 1969. The school was initially separated by gender; the effects of this policy can still be seen in the building as all men's restrooms are all on the north side and all women's bathrooms are on the south side.

Demographics
The demographic breakdown of the 312 students enrolled for 2019-20 was:

Native American/Alaskan - 0.3&
Asian - 3.8%
Black - 2.6%
Hispanic - 3.8%
White - 84.4%
Native Hawaiian/Pacific islanders - 0.6%
Multiracial - 4.5%

Athletics 
The Bishop Foley Ventures compete in the Catholic High School League. School colors are black, white and gold. The following Michigan High School Athletic Association (MHSAA)  sanctioned sports are offered:

Baseball (boys) 
State champion - 2011, 2012, 2013, 2017
Basketball (boys and girls) 
Bowling (boys and girls) 
Competitive cheerleading (girls)
State champion  - 1996
Cross country (boys and girls) 
Football (boys) 
Golf (boys and girls) 
Ice hockey (boys) 
LaCrosse (boys) 
Skiing (boys) 
Soccer (boys and girls) 
Girls state champion - 1988, 1990, 1993, 1984, 1995, 1997, 1998, 1999, 2001, 2002, 2003, 2011
Boys state champion - 1988, 1997
Softball (girls)
Swim and dive (boys and girls) 
Tennis (girls) 
Track and field (boys and girls) 
Volleyball (girls) 
Wrestling (boys)

Notable alumni
Mark Campbell, National Football League (NFL) tight end
Tom Jankiewicz, screenwriter
Porcelain Black - singer
John Keating, Fox Sports Detroit sportscaster

References

External links
 

Roman Catholic Archdiocese of Detroit
Catholic secondary schools in Michigan
High schools in Oakland County, Michigan
Educational institutions established in 1965
1965 establishments in Michigan